1949 Scottish League Cup final may refer to one of two Scottish League Cup finals played in 1949:
 1949 Scottish League Cup final (March), Rangers 2–0 Raith Rovers
 1949 Scottish League Cup final (October), East Fife 3–0 Dunfermline Athletic